Honeychild is the third solo studio album by New Zealand singer Jenny Morris, released in October 1991 by East West Records. The album went for the same style as Morris's other two albums' acoustic pop, with a hint of dance music, and was produced by Nick Launay, with some songs co-produced by Mark Forrester. The album included a cover version of the song "Tempted" by the English band Squeeze.

Honeychild was Morris's second most successful album, after Shiver, peaking at #5 in Australia, and being accredited platinum by ARIA. Morris also received a nomination in the "Best Female Artist" category at the 1992 ARIA Music Awards.

"Break in the Weather", the first single released from the album in September 1991, became Morris's highest-charting single in Australia, peaking at #2.  It also peaked at #5 in New Zealand.  "I've Had You", released in November 1991, fared less well on the charts, peaking at #39 in both Australia and New Zealand. "Zero", the third single from the album, peaked at #33 in New Zealand, and number #89 in Australia.  The final single released from the album, "Crackerjack Man", failed to chart.

Track listing

Charts

Weekly charts

Year-end charts

Certifications

Personnel

Musicians
 Mike Bukovsky - horns (tracks: 2, 5)
 Ashley Cadell - keyboards (tracks: 1 to 3, 6, 8, 10, 12)
 Dave Dobbyn - vocals (tracks: 1, 8)
 Sly Dunbar - drums  (tracks: 1-3, 5, 6, 8, 10, 11)
 Andrew Farriss - guitar, keyboards (tracks: 1, 2, 3, 9, 10)
 Ricky Fataar - vocals (tracks: 1, 8)
 Chris Green - horns (tracks: 2, 5)
 James Green - horns (tracks: 2, 5)
 Chong Lim - keyboards (tracks: 9, 12)
 Roger Mason - keyboards (tracks: 4, 7, 12)
 Don Miller-Robinson - guitar, keyboards (tracks: 1, 2, 3, 4, 5, 6, 7, 8, 10, 11)
 Jenny Morris - vocals
 Victor Rounds - bass (tracks: 4, 12)
 Robbie Shakespeare - bass (tracks: 1-3, 5, 6, 8, 10, 11)
 Sunil de Silva - percussion (tracks: 1-8, 10-12)
 James Valentine - horns (tracks: 2, 5)
 Wendy Matthews - vocals (tracks: 8, 10)

Production
 Art direction - Cheryl Collins
 Photography - Grant Matthews, Stephen Price
 Producer - Jenny Morris (tracks: 4, 7, 9, 12)
 Producer, sound engineer, mixer - Mark Forrester (tracks: 4, 7, 9, 12), Nick Launay (tracks: 1-3, 5, 6, 8, 10, 11)

References

1991 albums
East West Records albums
Jenny Morris (musician) albums
Albums produced by Nick Launay